Mauria is a genus of plants in the family Anacardiaceae.

Taxonomy

Species

, Plants of the World online has 15 accepted species:

References

 
Anacardiaceae genera
Taxonomy articles created by Polbot